is a railway line in Hokkaido, Japan, operated by Hokkaido Railway Company (JR Hokkaido) between  in Asahikawa and Abashiri Station in Abashiri.

Basic data
Operators, distances
Hokkaido Railway Company  (Services and tracks)
Whole line, from Shin-Asahikawa to Abashiri: 
Japan Freight Railway Company (Services)
From Shin-Asahikawa to Kitami: 
Signal boxes: 4
Track: single
Block system: Automatic

Services
The Okhotsk limited express train, named after the Sea of Okhotsk, runs from Sapporo to Abashiri with two daily return workings. The Taisetsu limited express train runs from Asahikawa to Abashiri with two return workings daily. The limited rapid train Kitami operates between Asahikawa and Kitami, with one return service daily.

Local services along the line are roughly divided into three segments. In the segment between Asahikawa and Kamikawa, the line functions as a commuter rail of Asahikawa City. There is one local train service per one to two hours. The segment between Kamikawa and Engaru is a sparsely populated area. Between Kamikawa and Shirataki, a local train runs one lap per day. For the segment between Engaru and Abashiri, there is one local train service per one to two hours.

Stations
LE: Limited Express Okhotsk/Taisetsu
LR: Limited Rapid Kitami
All non-local trains stop at stations marked +, Some stop at those marked *, No such trains (other than local) stop at those marked -. Local trains may skip stations marked ◌.

Closed Stations 
Nakakoshi, Oku-Shirataki and Temmaku: Since 1 July 2001, of which Nakakoshi and Oku-Shirataki downgraded to signal bases
Shin-sakaeno: Since 18 March 2006
A44 , A54 , A46  and A47 : Since 26 March 2016, of which Kanehana and Shimo-Shirataki downgraded to signal bases

A52 , A33 , A36  and A42 : Since 13 March 2021

History
The principal route between Sapporo and Okhotsk Subprefecture has changed several times. The route shortened by  when the section between Takikawa and Furano on the Nemuro Main Line opened in 1913.

A third route was a shortcut between Asahikawa and Engaru, straight through the Kitami Pass. The , completed in 1932, finally completed the main route still used today.

The current Sekihoku Main Line consists of the remnants of these three lines. The section between Shin-Asahikawa and Engaru is from the Sekihoku Line, the section between Engaru and Kitami from the Yūbetsu Line, and the section between Kitami and Abashiri from the Abashiri Main Line.

The first of the abovementioned sections to open was from Abashiri to Kitami in 1912. The Kitami to Engaru line was opened between 1912 and 1915 as a  gauge line, but was converted to  gauge in 1916.

The Asahikawa to Kamikawa section opened between 1922 and 1923, and the Engaru to Shiritaki section between 1927 and 1929. The final section, including the Ishikita tunnel, opened in 1932.

In July 2015, JR Hokkaido announced that it would be closing four stations line (Shimo-Shirataki Station, Kyu-Shirataki Station, Kami-Shirataki Station, and Kanehana Station) in March 2016, due to low passenger usage.

See also
List of railway lines in Japan

References

External links
 JR Hokkaido official website 
 JR Hokkaido official website 

Rail transport in Hokkaido
Lines of Hokkaido Railway Company
1067 mm gauge railways in Japan
Railway lines opened in 1932